The 1997 Brisbane Broncos season was the tenth in the history of the Brisbane Broncos club. This season was unique in that they participated in the Australian Super League's 1997 Telstra Cup premiership and 1997 World Club Championship, winning both competitions.

Season summary
The Broncos again won their first 7 matches, before finally losing to the Penrith Panthers in round 8. Brisbane won their final three regular season games to capture their second minor premiership. In the Major Semi-Final against Cronulla the Broncos thrashed the sharks to move into their first home Grand Final. The Sharks recovered to make the big one, but they were no match for the Broncos. Despite being without key forward Glenn Lazarus and hampered by a troublesome groin injury, Allan Langer led his side to victory 26–8 for their third premiership in front of almost 60,000 home fans. Steve Renouf scored a hat-trick in the match.

Following the premiership win, the Broncos also won the 1997 World Club Championship which involved clubs from the Super League as well.

Match results

World Club Challenges Match results

Ladders

Telstra Cup Premiership Ladder

World Club Challenge Australasia Pool A

Scorers

Grand final

20 September

Brisbane 26 (TRIES: Renouf 3, Hancock; GOALS: Lockyer 5/6)

defeated

Cronulla 8 (TRIES: Richardson; GOALS: Rogers 2/2)

Halftime: Brisbane 10–2

Referee: Bill Harrigan

Stadium: ANZ Stadium, (Brisbane)

Crowd: 58, 912

Honours

League
Nil

Club
Player of the year: Peter Ryan
Rookie of the year: Michael De Vere
Back of the year: Kevin Walters
Forward of the year: Brad Thorn
Club man of the year: Tony Spencer

References

External links
Brisbane Broncos 1997 at bronconet.org
Superleague 1997 Brisbane Broncos Statistics – Summary at rugbyleagueproject.com

Brisbane Broncos seasons
Brisbane Broncos season